Pratima Kumari is an Indian weightlifter. Twenty-eight-year-old Pratima, a double gold medallist at the Manchester Commonwealth Games in 2002. She was subsequently suspended from international competition for a period of two years.

References

External links

Indian female weightlifters
Commonwealth Games gold medallists for India
Weightlifters at the 2002 Commonwealth Games
Living people
Weightlifters at the 1998 Asian Games
Weightlifters at the 2002 Asian Games
Doping cases in weightlifting
Commonwealth Games medallists in weightlifting
21st-century Indian women
21st-century Indian people
Year of birth missing (living people)
Asian Games competitors for India
Medallists at the 2002 Commonwealth Games